William Kenneth Davidson (June 30, 1904 – March 4, 1974) was an American restaurateur and Illinois politician.

Davidson was born in Toledo, Iowa and attended Toledo public schools. Davidson went to Bradley University and then worked as a salesman in Illinois and Iowa. In 1931, he started Davidson's Restaurant in Kewanee, Illinois. Davidson was a member of the Illinois Restaurant Association and served as president of the association in 1947. Davidson served on the Kewanee City Council and was a Republican. He served in the Illinois House of Representatives from 1957 to 1965 and from 1967 to 1969. Davidson then served in the Illinois Senate from 1969 to 1973. Davidson died from a heart attack in a hospital in Aransas Pass, Texas, while on vacation with his wife.

Notes

1904 births
1974 deaths
People from Toledo, Iowa
People from Kewanee, Illinois
Businesspeople from Illinois
Businesspeople from Iowa
Bradley University alumni
Illinois city council members
Republican Party members of the Illinois House of Representatives
Republican Party Illinois state senators
20th-century American politicians
20th-century American businesspeople